Dundee United finished the Scottish Premier League 2007–08 season in 5th place with 52 points. Noel Hunt was the top scorer with 18 goals.

Review and events
The pre-season period began with two new permanent signings at the club, Polish goalkeeper Łukasz Załuska and Darren Dods having signed deals in June. Irishman Willo Flood also arrived from Cardiff City on a season-long loan deal. In July, former Ajax youngster Prince Buaben signed after a successful trial and was joined by a second Polish keeper, Grzegorz Szamotulski, in time for the league season. Englishman Jordan Robertson became the second long-term loan signing when he arrived from Sheffield United in late August.

A number of players who were out of contract left the club following the end of the 2006–07 season. Lee Mair signed a pre-contract deal with Aberdeen and Derek Stillie moved to England to pursue a law career. David McCracken and Collin Samuel were both released. Also leaving the club were a number of younger players who had failed to earn extensions to their contracts. These were Gregg Burnett, Barry Callaghan and Ross Gardiner. All had played at least once for the first team.

The first game of the season was home to Aberdeen in the SPL, and ended in a 1–0 victory. As the season progressed, United maintained their high league table position, ending 2007 in 4th place.

The club lost to Rangers in the CIS Insurance Cup final in March, losing on penalties. The Scottish Cup campaign was ended by St Mirren in the fifth round.

Chronological list of events
This is a list of the significant events to occur at the club during the 2007–08 season, presented in chronological order. This list does not include transfers, which are listed in the transfers section below, or match results, which are in the results section.

26 July: Played a pre-season friendly against Barcelona, losing 1–0 to a last-minute Thierry Henry goal. Minutes earlier, Barry Robson had seen a legitimate header wrongly disallowed.
4 August: United win the opening league match of the season for the first time in eight years. It was only their second opening day win since the 1992–93 season.
6 September: Cameroonian striker Patrick Suffo arrives on trial.
18 September: French midfielder Morgaro Gomis signs a two-year contract extension.
8 November: Craig Levein picks up the Premier League Manager of the Month award for October.
10 November: Lee Wilkie follows manager Craig Levein by picking up the Premier League October Player of the Month award.
4 December: Gary Kirk leaves Raith Rovers to replaces Tony Docherty as club coach, after Docherty moved to St Johnstone.
28 December: Goalkeeper Grzegorz Szamotulski delays his departure and extends his contract by a month until the end of the transfer window.
29 December: Motherwell captain Phil O'Donnell collapses during the 5–3 win over United and is pronounced dead thirty minutes after the match.
7 January: United turn down a £175,000 bid from Blackpool for top scorer Noel Hunt.
18 January: Jordan Robertson is recalled from his loan spell by Sheffield United.
21 January: Manager Craig Levein's role is extended to include director of football.
23 January: United reject bids from Burnley and Nottm Forest for captain Barry Robson.
14 February: chairman Eddie Thompson appoints his son Stephen as chief executive.
21 March: The East Stand at Tannadice is renamed after chairman Eddie Thompson.
8 April: French striker Joël Thomas arrives for a ten-day trial
12 May: Referee Mike McCurry publicly admits that he got two decisions wrong in the match against Rangers, wrongly denying United both a penalty and goal.
16 May: Australian defender Scott Jamieson arrives for a fourteen-day trial
20 May: The club submit an official complaint to the SFA following Mike McCurry's handling of the match at Ibrox against Rangers
20 May: A second friendly is arranged against Barcelona with the 'rematch' scheduled for 26 July.
26 May: The club announce the possibility of taking legal action against George Peat after the SFA president branded manager Craig Levein's earlier comments "criminal".

Match results
Dundee United played a total of 46 competitive matches during the 2007–08 season, as well as four first team pre-season friendlies. The team finished fifth in the Scottish Premier League.

In the cup competitions, United were runners up in the final of the CIS Insurance Cup, losing on penalties to Rangers. United lost to St Mirren in the Scottish Cup fifth round, after a replay.

Scottish Premier League

Source: BBC Sport website: Scottish Premier

Scottish Cup

CIS Insurance Cup

Source: BBC Sport website: Scottish Cups

Player stats
During the 2007–08 season, United used 30 different players on the pitch. The table below shows the number of appearances and goals scored by each player.

|}

Goalscorers
Fifteen players scored for the United first team with the team scoring 64 goals in total. The top goalscorer was Noel Hunt with 18 goals.

Discipline
During the 2007–08 season, nine United players were sent off and 15 received at least one caution. In total, the team received nine red cards and 56 yellow cards.

Team statistics

League table

Transfers

In
United signed ten players during the season with an eleventh after the season had finished. Four players were signed on loan.

Out
Five players left United during the season, with a number of young players spending time on loan with lower league clubs. Two player also agreed moves at the end of the season.

Playing kit

The jerseys were sponsored for a second (and final) season by Anglian Home Improvements (who again sponsored Motherwell). The sponsor logo is displayed as a simple font across the chest, with white logo for the home top and black logo on the change strip. The shorts were again sponsored by Ole International after the Spanish property firm extended the deal for a second year. The shorts logo is displayed on the right hand side, above the club badge. The expiry of both deals at the end of the season means the club will have at least one new sponsorship for 2008–09, as the option of a third year of shirt sponsorship was passed for a new one-year deal with JD Sports' Carbrini Sportswear label for 2008–09.

The club has no third strip, with the last third strip used in the 2002–03 season.

Awards
 Scottish Premier League Manager of the Month: 1
 Craig Levein (October 2007)

 Scottish Premier League Player of the Month: 2
 Lee Wilkie (October 2007), Barry Robson (January 2008)

 Scottish Premier League Young Player of the Month: 2
 Danny Grainger (January 2008), Garry Kenneth (March 2008)

 Scottish Premier League Goal of the Season: 1
 Willo Flood (2007–08)

References

External links
 Official site: 2007/08 Fixtures
 BBC – Club stats
 Soccerbase – Results  | Squad stats | Transfers

2007-08
Scottish football clubs 2007–08 season